Whitman Publishing is an American book publishing company which started as a subsidiary of the Western Printing & Lithographing Company of Racine, Wisconsin. In about 1915, Western began printing and binding a line of juvenile books for the Hamming-Whitman Publishing Company of Chicago. A few years later Hamming-Whitman went bankrupt, and Western took over the company, found success in selling the inventory of low-cost juvenile books, and formed the Whitman Publishing Company. Whitman now primarily produces coin and stamp collecting books and materials. The company is owned by Anderson Press.

Children's book publisher
From the early 1900s to the mid 1980s, Whitman was a popular children's book publisher. For decades it was a subsidiary of Western Publishing Company. In 1933 the company signed a licensing contract with Walt Disney to produce books based on Disney cartoon characters, such as Mickey Mouse, Donald Duck, and Goofy.

Whitman also published Whitman Authorized Editions with stories featuring fictionalized versions of popular actresses of the 1940s and, later, novels based upon popular television shows, such as Captain Kangaroo, the Patty Duke Show, and The Beverly Hillbillies.

One of Whitman's most popular mystery series was Trixie Belden. In 1977 they launched the Trixie Belden Fan Club, and issued a lower-priced paperback book format of the series. At the time some booksellers stated that the Trixie Belden books were more popular than Nancy Drew and The Hardy Boys books.

Whitman published the popular Big Little Books and Better Little Books. The early Big Little Books had print runs of 250,000 to 350,000 for each title, with no reprints.

They also published illustrated card games including War, Hearts, Fish, Old Maid, and Crazy Eights.

Coin and stamp collecting products
By the mid-1930s Whitman began a line of “coin boards” that helped popularize the coin collecting hobby. Whitman’s Handbook of United States Coins was first published in 1942. The first edition of Whitman’s Guide Book of United States Coins (the “Red Book”) was published in 1946. 
 
This started an expanding line of books aimed at numismatists. The line continued as Western was sold to Mattel in 1982, then was spun off and renamed Golden Books Family Entertainment. The new company sold Whitman Coin Products and other adult lines to St. Martin's Press. St. Martin's, in turn, sold Whitman Coin Products to the H.E. Harris company, another publisher that specialized in coin and postage stamp collecting materials. H.E. Harris was then renamed Whitman Publishing, which continues to produce primarily coin and postage stamp collecting books materials.

Whitman operates the websites Coin Update, Mint News Blog and World Mint News Blog. Today, Whitman Publishing is owned by Anderson Press. As of 2017, Whitman was also publishing books on other topics in addition to the coin and postage stamp collecting materials and books.

Gallery

References

External links

Book publishing companies of the United States
Numismatics